Badon may refer to:

Badon, region in India
Badon River, Romanian river
Battle of Badon, 5th century Welsh battle
Bobby Badon, former Louisiana State Representative 
Hereclean, also known as Badon, Romanian village